Starship Troopers is a first-person shooter game developed by British company Strangelite Studios and published by Empire Interactive. The game is based on the 1997 movie of the same name by Paul Verhoeven.

Set five years after the events of the movie, the game lets players assume the role of 'Marauder Zero Six' as they assault the planet Hesperus which has been invaded by the Arachnids. The game features the footage from the original movie and the sequel Starship Troopers 2: Hero of the Federation (2004).

Gameplay

Single-player
The single-player game features a campaign mode consisting of a series of missions connected by mission briefings. After a level is completed it is then available to play in a Level Attack mode, which is similar to a time trial mode, except a score and the number of kills are also recorded.

There are three different levels of difficulty: easy, medium, and hard. The level of difficulty affects the AI of the bugs, which means they will notice and attack players sooner on hard than on easy. The different levels also affect the amount of ammunition and grenades available throughout the missions, and the health of the bosses.

Most missions involve a player completing a single objective, with obstacles on the way. For example, the player's ultimate objective is to rescue comrades. The player may have to find the soldiers, protect them, retrieve supplies, fix equipment, and then escape.

During the course of a mission, a player may run into one or more bosses, often a Royal warrior or a bug that performs a heavy support role, such as a plasma bug or a tanker. As the game progresses, and tougher enemies are introduced, better guns are made available to the player.

Multiplayer
Multiplayer in Starship Troopers consists of three different modes; Deathmatch, Team Deathmatch and Co-op. The most popular mode is Co-op, which sees players defending a mechanic from an onslaught of arachnids whilst retrieving parts to repair a dropship to escape in. The network and lobby functions were provided by Demonware, who have now withdrawn the services.

Promised dedicated server and modification tools were never released, along with the closing of the official English forums player numbers in the multiplayer game were very low. The game also lacked any console or server commands which makes it impossible to execute a variety of necessary admin functions such as kick, ban or a map change. Lastly as the balancing of the weapons is directly inherited from the single-player mode this means that deathmatch play is not very competitive. A player who picks up the rocket launcher for example is likely to dominate the game because it deals significantly more damage compared to many other weapons, has an area of effect, can be fired rapidly and has a very large magazine.

Patches released for the game mainly focused upon improving the game's multiplayer mode. The latest, version 5.24 released in December 2005, introduced four new DM/TDM maps and three new co-op maps.

Reception

The game received "generally unfavorable reviews" according to the review aggregation website Metacritic. GameSpot and IGN stated technical issues, such as problems with the AI and archaic graphics as the reason for the low score. There are also very few character models, leaving most troopers looking identical. The sound bytes used for the troopers' voices are also repeated many times throughout the game, with some bytes placed at inappropriate times.

References

External links
 

2005 video games
Alien invasions in video games
Alternate history video games
Empire Interactive games
Games based on Starship Troopers
Military science fiction video games
Multiplayer and single-player video games
Video games about extraterrestrial life
Video games about insects
Video games based on adaptations
Video games based on novels
Video games based on films
Video games developed in the United Kingdom
Video games scored by Richard Jacques
Video games set on fictional planets
Windows games
Windows-only games